Tenzing Norgay   (tendzin norgyé; perhaps 29 May 1914 – 9 May 1986), born Namgyal Wangdi, and also referred to as Sherpa Tenzing, was a Nepali-Indian Sherpa mountaineer. He was one of the first two people known to reach the summit of Mount Everest, which he accomplished with Edmund Hillary on 29 May 1953. Time named Norgay one of the 100 most influential people of the 20th century.

Early life
There are conflicting accounts of Tenzing's early life. In his autobiography, he wrote that he was a Sherpa born and raised in Tengboche, Khumbu, in northeastern Nepal. In a 1985 interview with All India Radio, he said his parents came from Tibet, but that he was born in Nepal. According to many later accounts, including a book co-written by his son Jamling Tenzin Norgay, he was born in Tibet, at Tse Chu in the Kama Valley, and grew up in Thame. He spent his early childhood in Kharta, near the north of the country. Norgay went to Nepal as a child to work for a Sherpa family in Khumbu.

Khumbu lies near Mount Everest, which the Tibetans and Sherpas call Chomolungma; in Standard Tibetan, that name means "Holy Mother," or the goddess of the summit. Buddhism is the traditional religion of the Sherpas and Tibetans, and Norgay was Buddhist.

Although his exact date of birth is unknown, he knew it was in late May by the weather and the crops. After his ascent of Everest on 29 May 1953, he decided to celebrate his birthday on that day thereafter. His year of birth, according to the Tibetan calendar, was the Year of the Rabbit, making it likely that he was born in 1914.  This agrees with Hunt's statement that he was 39 in 1953, and had "established himself (as) not only the foremost climber of his race but as a mountaineer of world standing."

Tenzing was originally called "Namgyal Wangdi", but as a child his name was changed on the advice of the head lama and founder of Rongbuk Monastery, Ngawang Tenzin Norbu. "Tenzing Norgay" translates as "wealthy-fortunate-follower-of-religion." His father, a Tibetan yak herder, was Ghang La Mingma (d. 1949), and his mother, who was Tibetan, was Dokmo Kinzom. She lived to see him climb Everest. Tenzing was the 11th of 13 children, several of whom died young.

Tenzing ran away from home twice in his teens, first to Kathmandu and later to Darjeeling, India, the latter of which at that time was the starting point for most expeditions in the eastern Himalayas. He was once sent to Tengboche Monastery to become a monk, but he decided that was not for him and departed. At the age of 19 he settled in the Sherpa community in the Too Song Busti district of Darjeeling.

Mountaineering

Norgay received his first opportunity to join an Everest expedition at age 20, when Eric Shipton was assembling the 1935 British Mount Everest reconnaissance expedition. After two other prospective team members failed their medical tests, Norgay was pushed forward by his friend Ang Tharkay, a Sherpa sirdar who had been on the 1933 British Mount Everest expedition. His attractive smile caught the eye of Shipton, who decided to take him on.

Norgay participated as a high-altitude porter in three official British attempts to climb Everest from the northern Tibetan side in the 1930s. On the 1936 expedition, he worked with John Morris. He also took part in other climbs in various parts of the Indian subcontinent. For a time in the early 1940s, Norgay lived in the princely state of Chitral (that later became a part of Pakistan on partition of India) as batman to a Major Chapman. Norgay's first wife died and was buried there during his tenure in the state. He returned to Darjeeling with his two daughters during the Indian partition of 1947, and managed to cross India by train without a ticket and without being challenged, by wearing one of Major Chapman's old uniforms.

In 1947, Norgay participated in an unsuccessful summit attempt of Everest. Denman admitted defeat, and all three turned around, returning safely. In 1947, Norgay became a sirdar of a Swiss expedition for the first time, following his role in the rescue of Sirdar Wangdi Norbu, who had fallen and been seriously injured.

1952 Swiss Mount Everest expedition

In 1952, he took part in the two Swiss expeditions led by Edouard Wyss-Dunant (spring) and Gabriel Chevalley (autumn), the first serious attempts to climb Everest from the southern (Nepalese) side, after two previous US and British reconnaissance expeditions in 1950 and 1951. The expedition opened up a new route on Everest that was successfully climbed the next year.

Success on Mount Everest

In 1953, Tenzing Norgay took part in John Hunt's expedition; Tenzing had previously been to Everest six times (and Hunt three). A member of the team was Edmund Hillary, who had a near-miss following a fall into a crevasse but was saved from hitting the bottom by Norgay's prompt action in securing the rope using his ice axe, which led Hillary to consider him the climbing partner of choice for any future summit attempt.

At the time, newspaper reports variously referred to him as Tensing, Tenzing, Tenzing Bhotia, Tenzing Norgay, Tensing Norkey, Tenzing Sherpa or Dan Shin, as one Indian academic suggested.

The expedition set up base camp in March 1953. Hillary wrote in 1975 about first meeting Norgay in Kathmandu on 5 March 1953:

On 26 May, Tom Bourdillon and Charles Evans attempted the climb, but turned back when Evans' oxygen system failed. The pair had reached the South Summit, coming within 300 vertical feet (91 m) of the summit. Hunt then directed Norgay and Hillary to go for the summit.

Snow and wind held the pair up at the South Col for two days. They set out on 28 May with a support trio comprising Ang Nyima, Alfred Gregory and George Lowe. On the following morning, Hillary discovered that his boots had frozen solid outside the tent. He spent two hours warming them before he and Tenzing attempted the final ascent, wearing  packs. The last part of the ascent comprised a  rock face later named the "Hillary Step." Hillary saw a means to wedge his way up a crack in the face between the rock wall and the ice, and Norgay followed.

From there, the following effort was relatively simple. They reached Everest's  summit, the highest point on Earth, at 11:30 a.m. As Hillary put it, "A few more whacks of the ice axe in the firm snow, and we stood on top."

They spent only about 15 minutes at the summit. Hillary took the famous photo of Norgay posing with his ice-axe, but since Norgay had never used a camera, Hillary's ascent went unrecorded. However, according to Norgay's autobiography Man of Everest, when Norgay offered to take Hillary's photograph Hillary declined—"I motioned to Hillary that I would now take his picture. But for some reason he shook his head; he did not want it." Additional photos were taken looking down the mountain, in order to re-assure that they had made it to the top and to document that the ascent was not faked. The two had to take care on the descent after discovering that drifting snow had covered their tracks, complicating the task of retracing their steps. The first person they met was Lowe, who had climbed up to meet them with hot soup.

Afterwards, Norgay was met with great adulation in Nepal and India. Hillary and Hunt were knighted by Queen Elizabeth II, while Norgay received the George Medal for his efforts on the expedition. It has been suggested that Indian prime minister Jawaharlal Nehru refused permission for Norgay to be knighted.

Nonetheless, there was some inequity, according to National Geographic,"Hillary was knighted for being the first known person to climb to the top of Mount Everest. But Tenzing, who simultaneously reached its summit, only received an honorary medal. In the years since there's been growing disquiet at the lack of official recognition."

Norgay and Hillary were the first people to conclusively set foot on the summit of Mount Everest, but journalists were persistently repeating the question: "Which of the two men had the right to the glory of being the first one, and who was merely the second, the follower?" Colonel Hunt, the expedition leader, declared, "They reached it together, as a team."

Norgay eventually ended the speculation by revealing that Hillary was first in his 1955 autobiography. It was ghost-written by American writer James Ramsay Ullman as Tenzing could speak several languages but could not read or write. They were roped six feet apart, with most of the 30 foot rope in loops in his hand:

After Everest
Tenzing Norgay became the first Director of Field Training of the Himalayan Mountaineering Institute in Darjeeling, when it was set up in 1954.

In January 1975, with permission of the King of Bhutan, Jigme Singye Wangchuck, Norgay served as sirdar (guide) for the first American tourist party allowed into the country. Brought together by a company then called Mountain Travel (now called Mountain Travel-Sobek), the group first met Norgay in India before beginning the trek. The official trek began in Paro, northern Bhutan and included a visit to Tiger's Nest (Paro Taktsang), the ancient Buddhist monastery, before returning to India via Nepal and Sikkim. Norgay even introduced his group to the King of Sikkim (the last king of Sikkim, as Sikkim is now a part of India) and also brought them to his home in India for a farewell celebration.

In 1978 Norgay founded Tenzing Norgay Adventures, a company providing trekking adventures in the Himalayas. As of 2021, the company was run by his son Jamling Tenzing Norgay, who himself reached the summit of Everest in 1996.

On 10 May 1984 Tenzing Norgay, together with Grp Capt A. J. S. Grewal, Principal of the Himalayan Mountaineering Institute, attended the 10th-anniversary celebrations of The School of Adventure, Mysore, Karnataka held at the Mysore Institution of Engineers' auditorium.

Honours
In 1938, after Norgay's third Everest expedition as a porter, the Himalayan Club awarded him its Tiger Medal for high-altitude work.

On 7 June 1953, it was announced that the newly crowned Queen Elizabeth II wished to recognize Norgay's achievements. 10 Downing Street announced on 1 July that, following consultation with the governments of India and Nepal, the Queen had approved awarding Norgay the George Medal. He also received, along with the rest of the Everest party, the Queen Elizabeth II Coronation Medal. In May 2013, Norgay's grandson, Tashi Tenzing, said he believed his grandfather should have been knighted, not just given "a bloody medal."

In 1953, King Tribhuvan of Nepal presented him with the Order of the Star of Nepal, 1st Class (Supradipta-Manyabara-Nepal-Tara).

In 1959, the Government of India awarded him the Padma Bhushan, the third-highest civilian award of India. Indian Mountaineering Foundation presented him with its gold medal. 

On 1 March 1963, Norgay was awarded the honorary title of "Merited Master of Sport of the USSR" by the Soviet Union, becoming the first foreigner to receive this distinction. 

In September 2013, the Government of Nepal proposed naming a  mountain in Nepal Tenzing Peak in Norgay's honour. Both Tenzing Peak and Hillary Peak are points on the long Ridge from Cho Oyu to Gyuchung Kang with Tenzing Peak nearer to Cho Oyu

In July 2015, the highest-known,  mountain range on the dwarf planet Pluto was named Tenzing Montes.

Personal life and death 

Norgay was married three times. His first wife, Dawa Phuti, died young in 1944. They had a son, Nima Dorje, who died at the age of four, and two daughters: Pem Pem, whose son, Tashi Tenzing, climbed Everest, and Nima, who married a Filipino graphic designer, Noli Galang.

Norgay's second wife was Ang Lahmu, a cousin of his first wife. They had no biological children, but she was adoptive mother to their daughters from his earlier marriage with her cousin.

His third wife was Dakku, whom he married while his second wife was still alive, as allowed by Sherpa custom (see polygyny). They had three sons (Norbu, Jamling and Dhamey), and one daughter, Deki, who married American lawyer Clark Trainor. Jamling would join Peter Hillary, Edmund Hillary's son, in climbing Everest in 2003 on the 50th anniversary of their fathers' climb.

Other relatives include Norgay's nephews, Nawang Gombu and Topgay, who took part in the 1953 Everest expedition; and his grandsons, Tashi Tenzing, who lives in Sydney, Australia, and the Trainor grandsons: Tenzing, Kalden, and Yonden. Tenzing Trainor rose to fame as an actor on Liv and Maddie.

Norgay died of a cerebral hemorrhage in Darjeeling, West Bengal, India, on 9 May 1986 at the age of 71. His remains were cremated in the Himalayan Mountaineering Institute, Darjeeling, his favourite haunt. His widow Dakku died in 1992.

Legacy

Awards
 In 2003, commemorating the golden jubilee of Norgay's summit of Everest, Indian government renamed its highest adventure sports award, the Tenzing Norgay National Adventure Award after him.

Art, entertainment and media

Literature
 In 2011, Indian comic publisher Amar Chitra Katha released a children's comic book about Tenzing Norgay.

Film
 In Intolerable Cruelty, the 2003 American film by the Coen brothers, Norgay is mentioned by the film's main character in creating metaphor for the positive act of enabling.

Places
 One of the buildings at Everest Court, Mottingham in Kent, England is named after him.
In January 2008, Lukla Airport was renamed Tenzing–Hillary Airport in honour of the pair and their achievement.
 Tenzing Montes is the name of an icy mountain range on the surface of Pluto.
 Minor planet 6481 Tenzing is named in his honour.

Animals
 Red pandas at several zoos are named in his honour.

Consumer Goods
 The energy drink brand TENZING is named in his honour

See also 
Relatives of Tenzing Norgay:
 Nawang Gombu Sherpa
 Jamling Tenzing Norgay
 Tashi Tenzing
 Lobsang Tshering

Notes

References
Tony Astill, Mount Everest The Reconnaissance 1935 (2005)
George Band, Everest Exposed (2005), an account of the 1953 expedition
 
 (The Conquest of Everest in America) 
Tashi Tenzing and Judy Tenzing, Tenzing Norgay and Sherpas of Everest (2003)
Ed Webster, Snow in the Kingdom (2000)
Ed Douglas, Tenzing: Hero of Everest (2003)
Jamling Tenzing Norgay, Touching My Father's Soul (2002)
Tenzing Norgay and Malcolm Barnes, After Everest (1978)
Tenzing Norgay and James Ramsey Ullman Man of Everest (1955) (also published as The Tiger of the Snows)

External links 

 Tenzing Norgay , Royal Geographical Society
 Tenzing Norgay Sherpa Foundation

 

1914 births
1986 deaths
People from Solukhumbu District
Recipients of the George Medal
Indian Buddhists
Indian mountain climbers
Nepalese Buddhists
Nepalese mountain climbers
Recipients of the Padma Bhushan in sports
Recipients of the Order of the Star of Nepal
Sherpa summiters of Mount Everest
Nepalese emigrants to India
Indian summiters of Mount Everest
Nepalese summiters of Mount Everest

Edmund Hillary
Recipients of Indian Mountaineering Foundation's Gold Medal